Aleksander Baumgardten (1908–1980) was a Polish poet.

He was born on 31 May 1908 in Kraków, Poland, and died sometime in 1980 in Katowice, Poland

Polish male poets
1908 births
1980 deaths
20th-century Polish poets
20th-century Polish male writers